The Congress of the Republic was the legislative body of the First Portuguese Republic. The Congress was formed by two chambers, the Senate and the Chamber of Deputies.
Home of the Congress was the Palácio de São Bento, the current home of the Assembly of the Republic, in Lisbon.

See also 
 First Portuguese Republic
 Constitution of Portugal (1911)

First Portuguese Republic